Players and pairs who neither have high enough rankings nor receive wild cards may participate in a qualifying tournament held one week before the annual Wimbledon Tennis Championships.

Seeds

  Bryanne Stewart /  Christina Wheeler (qualified)
  Yuliana Fedak /  Galina Fokina (qualifying competition)
  Jill Craybas /  Vanessa Webb (qualified)
  Maret Ani /  Kim Grant (first round)
  Ansley Cargill /  Kelly Liggan (first round)
  Nicole Sewell /  Sarah Stone (qualified)
  Elizabeth Schmidt /  Anousjka van Exel (qualifying competition)
  Stanislava Hrozenská /  Ľubomíra Kurhajcová (first round)

Qualifiers

  Bryanne Stewart /  Christina Wheeler
  Francesca Schiavone /  Adriana Serra Zanetti
  Jill Craybas /  Vanessa Webb
  Nicole Sewell /  Sarah Stone

Qualifying draw

First qualifier

Second qualifier

Third qualifier

Fourth qualifier

External links

2003 Wimbledon Championships on WTAtennis.com
2003 Wimbledon Championships – Women's draws and results at the International Tennis Federation

Women's Doubles Qualifying
Wimbledon Championship by year – Women's doubles qualifying
Wimbledon Championships